Sir Charles Benedict Ainslie  (born 5 February 1977) is a British competitive sailor. Ainslie is the most successful sailor in Olympic history. He won medals at five consecutive Olympics from 1996 onwards, including gold at the four consecutive Games (Sydney, Athens, Beijing & London) held between 2000 and 2012.

He is one of three athletes to win medals in five different Olympic Games in sailing, being the third person to win five Olympic medals in that sport (after Torben Grael and Robert Scheidt) and also the second to win four gold medals, after Paul Elvstrøm.

Ben is Team Principal, CEO and Skipper of INEOS Britannia and CEO and Driver of the Great Britain SailGP Team.

Early life
Ainslie was born in Macclesfield, England to Roddy and Sue Ainslie. Roddy captained a boat that took part in the first Whitbread Round The World Race in 1973. Ben's elder sister, Fleur, is married to Jerome Pels, former secretary general of the International Sailing Federation (ISAF). Ainslie was educated at two independent schools: at the Terra Nova School in a rural area near the village of Holmes Chapel in Cheshire in north west England, and Truro School in the city of Truro, Cornwall, followed by Peter Symonds Sixth Form, Winchester, Hampshire.

Career
Ainslie learned to sail at Restronguet Creek near Falmouth, Cornwall.

He started sailing at the age of eight and first competed at the age of ten. His first international competition was aged twelve at the 1989 Optimist world championships held in Japan where he placed 73rd.

Olympics
Ainslie won silver at the 1996 Olympic Games and gold in the 2000 Summer Olympics in the Laser class. Both his gold medal winning Laser and Finn dinghies are currently displayed at the National Maritime Museum Cornwall.

On 19 May 2012, Ainslie became the first person to carry the Olympic torch in the UK. Starting the 70-day tour of the United Kingdom at Land's End, he was the first of 8,000 torch carriers. He was selected on 11 August 2012 to carry the flag for the Great Britain team at the London 2012 Olympics closing ceremony.

World Championship

World Championships titles
 1st 1993 Laser Radial World Championships
 1st 1995 IYRU Youth Sailing World Championships in Hamilton, Bermuda.
 1st 1998 Laser World Championships
 1st 1999 Laser World Championships
 1st 2002 Finn World Championships
 1st 2003 ISAF Sailing World Championships which effectively is the Finn World Championships
 1st 2004 Finn World Championships
 1st 2005 Finn World Championships
 1st 2008 Finn World Championships
 1st 2010 ISAF Open Match Racing World Championship
 1st 2012 Finn World Championships

Other World Championships results
 73rd 1989 Optimist World Championships held in Japan
 109th 1991 Optimist World Championships held in Greece
 37th 1992 Optimist World Championships held in Argentina
 2nd 1994 IYRU Youth Sailing World Championships in Marathon
 43rd 1994 Laser World Championship
 21st 1995 Laser World Championship
 3rd 1996 Laser World Championship
 3rd 1997 Laser World Championship
 3rd 2000 Laser World Championship
 3rd 2009 Etchells World Championships
 11th 2011 ISAF Sailing World Championships which effectively is the Finn World Championship

At the 2011 ISAF Sailing World Championships he was in a winning position going into the closing stages of the regatta but was disqualified under rule 69 (gross misconduct) for physically threatening a photographer. Ainslie felt the photographer's boat's wake had prevented him from passing a competitor.

Other significant results
 1st 1993 Laser Radial European Championship, Greece
 1st 2006 Rolex Maxi Yacht Cup - Maxi - Alfa Romeo
 1st 2008 Rolex Maxi Yacht Cup - Mini Maxi - Alfa Romeo 3
 1st 2009 Transpac Race and monohull record time (5 days 14 hours) Alfa Romeo
 4th 2010 Team Origin – TP52 Audi Medcup
 2013 The Round the Island Race record and line Honors JPMorgan
 1st 2015/2016 Americas Cup World Series Land Rover BAR

America's Cup

 One World Challenge – Seattle Yacht Club
 Team New Zealand – Royal New Zealand Yacht Squadron
At the beginning of 2005 Ainslie worked in the role of tactician in the New Zealand-based Team New Zealand who were preparing to compete in the challenger selection process to win the right to Challenge for the 32nd America's Cup. In May 2005 Ainslie took the decision to relinquish the role of tactician and focus on improving his match racing skills as helmsman of the 'B' boat used to practice and tune the race boat helmed by Dean Barker.
 Team Origin – Royal Thames Yacht Club
Ainslie figure headed a British challenge for the Cup alongside Sir Keith Mills the team was named Team Origin. However this challenge withdrew without competing following a period of discussion regarding the future format of the event.
 Oracle Team USA – Golden Gate Yacht Club
For the 2013 America's Cup, Ainslie was recruited as a tactician by Oracle Team USA, as a replacement for John Kostecki during an Oracle practice session on 11 September 2013. On 12 September, the following day, he replaced Kostecki going into race six of the 2013 America's Cup. His Oracle Team USA beat Team New Zealand in the America's Cup decider in San Francisco on 25 September.
 Ben Ainslie Racing – Royal Yacht Squadron Racing Ltd
In January 2012, Ben Ainslie announced the formation of an eponymous team to compete in the America's Cup: Ben Ainslie Racing (BAR). His team competed in the AC45 class of the 2011–13 America's Cup World Series, 2014 Extreme Sailing Series and set a multihull record for the Round the Island Race. The team won the 2015–16 America's Cup World Series but were eliminated in the semi-finals of the 2017 Louis Vuitton Challenger's Trophy competition to determine the challenger for the 2017 America's Cup.
 INEOS TEAM UK - Royal Yacht Squadron Racing Ltd
In April 2018 Ainslie announced the Americas Cup team would be renamed INEOS TEAM UK in partnership with INEOS and Sir Jim Ratcliffe. Again based out of the Portsmouth HQ the team are building two new 75-foot foiling monohull yachts to compete for the 36th Americas Cup set to take place in Auckland, New Zealand in 2021.

On October 21, 2020, Ben and INEOS TEAM UK launched their race boat for the 36th America's Cup from their HQ in Auckland, naming the AC75 race boat 'Britannia'
Following a disappointing performance in the Auckland ACWS event in December 2020, the team spent the following three weeks making modifications to their boat Britannia ahead of the start of the Prada Cup qualifying series. This included a new mast and sails as well as modifications to the hull and foils. The team received support from INEOS sponsored Mercedes-AMG Petronas F1 Team.

INEOS Team UK dominated the Round Robin phase of the Prada Cup which saw them race and beat each of the two other challenger teams three times, securing their place in the Prada Cup Final beginning on the 13th of February 2021. The team's place in the Prada Cup final marked a significant point in their campaign, being the furthest any British challenge had progressed in the competition since the introduction of a challenger selection series.

After Luna Rossa Prada Pirelli's win in the Prada Cup Semi-Finals against American Magic, the American team was eliminated from the event, securing the Italian team's place in the Prada Cup Final alongside INEOS Team UK.

The Prada Cup Finals were held in predominantly light wind (8-14 knots), with Luna Rossa showing great improvement in boat handling, winning the first 5 races consecutively. INEOS Team UK showed superior downwind pace in Race 6, taking their sole race win before Luna Rossa dominated Day 4 to take their sixth and seventh race win, winning the Prada Cup overall, and securing their place in the 36th America's Cup Match against Emirates Team New Zealand.

World Match Racing Tour 
In December 2010, Ainslie finished in first place in the World Match Racing Tour, and is the 2010 ISAF Match Racing Champion.

The Extreme Sailing Series
In January 2014, it was announced that Ainslie would compete in the 2014 Extreme Sailing Series as part of his preparation for the America's Cup. The eight-race event will see him compete in a  multi-hull boat.

Personal life
Ainslie lives in Seaview on the Isle of Wight and belongs to the Sea View Yacht Club and is an honorary member of the Royal Yacht Squadron. He was coached by David (Sid) Howlett, who raced a Finn dinghy at the 1976 Summer Olympics. He supports Chelsea.

In August 2014, Ainslie was one of 200 public figures who were signatories to a letter to The Guardian expressing their hope that Scotland would vote to remain part of the United Kingdom in September's referendum on that issue.

On 20 December 2014, Ainslie married former Sky Sports News presenter Georgie Thompson. The couple have a daughter, Bellatrix, born in 2016.

Awards and honours
 1995 British Yachtsman of the Year, and in 1999, 2000 and 2002.
 1998 International Sailing Federation World Sailor of the Year, and also in 2002, 2008 and 2012. Ainslie was also nominated in 2004 and 2011.
 2001 Member of the Order of the British Empire (MBE)
 2002 Honorary degree, University of Chichester
 2005 Officer of the Order of the British Empire (OBE)
 2005 Honorary Doctor of Laws, University of Exeter
 2007 Honorary Doctor of Sport, Southampton Solent University
 2008 Nominated for BBC Sports Personality of the Year and also in 2012 and 2013.
 2009 Commander of the Order of the British Empire (CBE)
 2013 Knight Bachelor for services to sailing.

References

External links

 
 
 
 
 Ben Ainslie Booking Agency Profile
 Ainslie Olympic profile 
 
 National Maritime Museum Cornwall website

1977 births
Living people
Commanders of the Order of the British Empire
English male sailors (sport)
English Olympic medallists
Etchells class sailors
Extreme Sailing Series sailors
Knights Bachelor
Laser Radial class sailors
Laser class world champions
Medalists at the 1996 Summer Olympics
Medalists at the 2000 Summer Olympics
Medalists at the 2004 Summer Olympics
Medalists at the 2008 Summer Olympics
Medalists at the 2012 Summer Olympics
Olympic gold medallists for Great Britain
Olympic medalists in sailing
Olympic sailors of Great Britain
Olympic silver medallists for Great Britain
People from Lymington
Sportspeople from Macclesfield
People educated at Peter Symonds College
People educated at Truro School
Sailors at the 1996 Summer Olympics – Laser
Sailors at the 2000 Summer Olympics – Laser
Sailors at the 2004 Summer Olympics – Finn
Sailors at the 2008 Summer Olympics – Finn
Sailors at the 2012 Summer Olympics – Finn
People in sports awarded knighthoods
Team New Zealand sailors
Oracle Racing sailors
2017 America's Cup sailors
2013 America's Cup sailors
2007 America's Cup sailors
2003 America's Cup sailors
Finn class world champions
World champions in sailing for Great Britain
2021 America's Cup sailors
ISAF World Sailor of the Year (male)